Nachinapally is a village and Gram panchayat of Duggondi mandal, Warangal district, in Telangana state.

Villages in Warangal district